The Vindhyachal Thermal Power Station is located in Singrauli district in the Indian state of Madhya Pradesh. One of the coal-fired power stations of NTPC, it is the largest power station in India, and the 9th largest coal-fired power station in the world, with an installed capacity of 4,760 MW. The coal for the power plant is sourced from Nigahi mines, and the water is sourced from the discharge canal of Singrauli Super Thermal Power Station. The plant is estimated to have been the coal-fired power plant which emitted the second most carbon dioxide in 2018, after Bełchatów Power Station, at 33.9 million tons, and relative emissions are estimated at 1.485 kg per kWh.

The electricity is consumed in the following states: Madhya Pradesh, Gujarat, Maharashtra, Goa, Chhattisgarh, Daman & Diu and Dadar Nagar Haveli.

Capacity

References

Coal-fired power stations in Madhya Pradesh
Singrauli district
1987 establishments in Madhya Pradesh
Energy infrastructure completed in 1987
20th-century architecture in India